To Sir, with Love may refer to:
 To Sir, With Love (novel), a 1959 novel by E. R. Braithwaite
 To Sir, with Love, a 1967 British drama film starring Sidney Poitier, adapted from the 1959 novel
 To Sir With Love (song), the theme song to the 1967 film, originally performed by Lulu
 To Sir, with Love (album), the soundtrack album to the 1967 film, featuring Lulu and The Mindbenders
 To Sir, with Love II, a 1996 American television drama film, a sequel to the 1967 film
 To Sir, with Love (2006 film), a South Korean horror film